Austrodiscus lopesi is a fossil species of air-breathing land snail, a terrestrial pulmonate gastropod mollusk in the family Charopidae, from the Paleocene deposits of the Itaboraí Basin in Brazil.

References

Charopidae
Paleocene gastropods
Gastropods described in 1989